Fahlore, or Fahlerz, refers to an ore consisting of complex sulfosalts, mostly the series between tennantite  and tetrahedrite . It comes from the German word for pale, fahl. This refers to the characteristic pale grey to dark black colour.

References 

Sulfide minerals